The Renault 15 and Renault 17 are two variations of the same coupé designed and built by French automaker Renault between July 1971 and August 1979. The R17 was sold as R177 in Italy, respecting the heptadecaphobia superstition.

They were effectively coupé versions of the Renault 12. The main differences between the two cars were their headlight configuration (the 15 had two rectangular headlights whereas the 17 had four round headlights) and their rear side windows. Some markets show the 17 with the rectangular lights for TL versions.

The Renault 15 and 17 were presented at the Paris Motor Show in October 1971.

Underpinnings
The chassis and most of the running gear came from the Renault 12, while the 1565 cc  A-Type engine in the more powerful R17 TS and R17 Gordini models was derived from the engine in the Renault 16 TS.  Though the mechanicals of the cars were derived from other Renaults, the body was completely new.

Chronology
At the 1974 Paris Motor Show, the Renault 17TS was renamed the "17 Gordini". This new name was an attempt to fill the gap left by the recently discontinued Renault 12 Gordini, nothing was changed beyond the badging.

There was a minor facelift during March 1976, most noticeable on the grille of the 15, where the chrome edge surround was replaced with a body-coloured one: the headlights were enlarged and brought forward to a position approximately flush with the surround. The grille of the 17 also lost its chrome surround, although on both cars the partially chrome front bumper now curved up at the edges to roughly half-way up the height of the grille.

The R15 and R17 remained in production until summer 1979 when they were both replaced by the Renault Fuego.

Performance tested
The British Autocar magazine tested a  Renault 15 TL in November 1972, shortly after the model's UK debut. The manufacturers' recommended retail price of £1,370 was slightly lower than the UK sticker price on a comparable Vauxhall Firenza Sport and Fiat 128 Coupé 1300: Ford's Capri 1300L at £1,123 massively undercut comparable cars in the UK at the time. The test concluded by pointing out that for buyers needing more power, more powerful Renault 15 and 17 variants were available, and that power apart, the 15 TL provided "a combination of attractive styling and careful development, excellent comfort and a high level of equipment and safety".

Global markets

Australia
The range was gradually introduced in Australia from May 1973. The 15TS and 17TL were initially available with the 17TS being promised later in the year. These 1973 model year vehicles contained several unique features, the stick-on mirror and sun visors from the Renault 12 to comply with regulations ("ADR"). The sun visor retaining catch on these models was never used and available only in Australia. The instrument panel "verandah" was fitted to reduce glare and was only fitted to Australian, North American and Scandinavian versions. Sales of these early models was slow in Australia due to their relatively high price, and the 17TL was discontinued there in late 1974.

In August 1974 the 17TS (R1317 with 1605 cc) finally made it to Australia, along with the European 1974 model year 15TS and 17TL with the later type dashboard. In early 1975 the 17TS was replaced by the 17 Gordini. Available later were the 15TS and 17TL with Gordini front suspension, inertia reel seat belts, tinted windows, tombstone seats and evaporative emission control as required by ADR. This was identified by the carbon canister under the bonnet, and hinged fuel filler door in the LBR quarter panel. In 1976 a final shipment of 1975 model year 17s was made and stock piled prior to the introduction of ADR 27A emission controls, these vehicles, again due to their high price, sold slowly through until 1978.

United States
The 17 was also marketed in the United States, off and on until the end of production in 1979, although it only ever sold in small numbers. For many years, it was Renault's only offering there aside from the Le Car.

Motorsport
Renault abandoned plans to contest the World Rally Championship which it won in 1973. Instead, the factory developed a high-performance version of the 17 coupé at the Alpine Competition Factory which used many A110 components to compete in "selected" European events. The Gordini-developed engine had two twin-choke Webers, a hot cam, 11.5 compression ratio, big valves and tuned extractor exhaust system. The body was very light, featuring fibreglass doors, boot and bonnet panels, with plastic windows and a stripped interior. The factory said the car's weight was lowered by more than 25 percent.

Its most famous outing was the 1974 "Press-on-Regardless" WRC, held in Michigan. The Rally was the US section of the World Rally Championship. The car that won the rally was a Renault 17 Gordini driven by Jean-Luc Thérier and Christian Deiferrer, with a similar car coming third.

WRC victories

{|class="wikitable" style="font-size: 95%; "
! No.
! Event
! Season
! Driver
! Co-driver
! Car
|-
| 1
|  26th Press-on-Regardless Rally
| 1974
|  Jean-Luc Thérier
|  Christian Delferrier
| Renault 17 Gordini
|-
|}

Timeline
 October 1971: Introduction of the Renault 15 and Renault 17 two-door coupés. The R15 TL, R15 TS and R17 TL all had a 4-speed gearbox whereas the R17 TS had a 5-speed gearbox.
 1973: Fabric sunroof available on R17 TL and TS.
 1974: R17 TS engine upgraded to 1605 cc.
 In late 1974, for the 1975 model year, the R17 TS is renamed R17 Gordini without any technical differences
March 1976: New R15 and R17 ranges introduced as follows: R15 TL, R15 GTL, R17 TS and R17 Gordini. The R15 TL/GTL were mechanically identical to the earlier R15 TL, while the R17 TS and Gordini had the 1647 cc engine from the Renault 16 TX.
 1979: R15/17 production ends.

Versions

References

External links

15 17
Coupés
Cars introduced in 1971
Group 4 (racing) cars
Sports cars